Zlatno may refer to several places in Slovakia.

Zlatno, Poltár District
Zlatno, Zlaté Moravce District